Articles on Close coupled include:

 Close-coupled canard, an aeronautical term
 Close-coupled cistern and bowl, a type of flush toilet
 Close-coupled sedan, an obsolete type of automobile